The Australian Security Intelligence Organisation Act 1979 (the ASIO Act) is an Act of the Parliament of Australia which replaced the Australian Security Intelligence Organisation Act 1956, which had established the Australian Security Intelligence Organisation (ASIO) as a statutory body. ASIO is the counter-intelligence and security agency of Australia, which had been established in 1949 by Prime Minister Ben Chifley's Directive for the Establishment and Maintenance of a Security Service under the executive power of the Constitution, under the control of the Director-General of Security and responsible to the Attorney-General.

After passage of the National Security Legislation Amendment Act 2014 by the Australian Parliament, ASIO officers are exempt from prosecution for a wide range of illegal activities in the course of conducting "operations". ASIO officers may carry arms, and the Minister responsible has the ability under certain conditions to approve the provision of any weapon or training to any specified person, even outside of ASIO officers.

Director-General of Security
The ASIO Act maintains the office of Director-General of Security and places ASIO under the Director-General's control.

Officers of the organisation
Officers of ASIO are employed under the ASIO Act, and are classed as Officers of the Commonwealth for the purposes of the Crimes Act 1914, which among other provisions makes impersonating an ASIO officer a criminal offence. The ASIO Act also makes the identification of ASIO officers a criminal offence punishable by one year imprisonment.

Special investigative powers
The ASIO Act defines the special investigative powers available to ASIO under warrant signed by the Attorney-General:
interception of telecommunications,
examination of postal and delivery articles,
use of clandestine surveillance and tracking devices,
remote access to computers, including alteration of data to conceal that access,
covert entry to and search of premises, including the removal or copying of any record or thing found therein, and
conduct of an ordinary or frisk search of a person if they are at or near a premises specified in the warrant.

The Director-General also has the power to independently issue a warrant in situations where a warrant has been requested of the Attorney-General but not yet granted, and a serious security situation arises.

Powers relating to investigation of terrorism

When investigating terrorism, the Director-General may also seek a warrant from an independent judicial authority to allow:
the compulsory questioning of suspects,
the detention of suspects by the Australian Federal Police, and their subsequent interrogation by ASIO officers,
ordinary, frisk or strip search of suspects by AFP officers upon their detainment,
the seizure of passports, and
the prevention of suspects leaving Australia.

The Director-General is not empowered to independently issue a terrorism-related warrant. These terrorism-related powers were scheduled to be automatically repealed on 22 July 2016.

Offences
Criminal offences established under the ASIO Act include:
 unauthorised communication of ASIO intelligence by an officer, employee or other person connected with ASIO - Penalty: 2 years' imprisonment,
 failure by an operator of an aircraft or vessel to answer questions from or provide documents to an ASIO officer relating to cargo, crew, passengers, stores or voyage - Penalty: 60 penalty units.
 unauthorised publication of identity of officer, employee or agent of ASIO - Penalty: 1 year's imprisonment.

See also
 Intelligence Services Act 2001

References
 Australian Security Intelligence Organisation Act 1979 (Commonwealth)

1979 in Australian law
Australian intelligence agencies
Acts of the Parliament of Australia